The Servant is the debut album of the London-based alternative band The Servant in 2004, released on the Prolifica Records label. The limited edition contained 15 tracks and totalled an hour in length.

Track listing

 "Cells" was used in the movie Transporter 2 (2005) and was included in its soundtrack. The instrumental version was used for the trailer for  Sin City, but wasn't included on its soundtrack.

Singles
 Orchestra (2003)
 Liquefy (2004)
 Cells (2005)
 I Can Walk in Your Mind (2005 - promo)

Personnel
 Dan Black - vocals, laptop, guitar
 Chris Burrows - guitar
 Matt Fisher - bass guitar
 Trevor Sharpe - drums, percussions

2004 debut albums
The Servant (band) albums